Dalbergia frutescens is a species of shrub distributed along the Atlantic coast of South America. Its habit is variable, usually being a liana.

Its claim to fame is that at some point Dalbergia frutescens var. tomentosa (restricted to Brazil) erroneously was assumed to yield the famous tulipwood.

References

frutescens
Flora of Brazil